Folco Lulli (3 July 1912 – 23 May 1970) was an Italian partisan and film actor. He appeared in more than 100 films between 1946 and 1970. He was the elder brother of actor Piero Lulli.

Selected filmography

 How I Lost the War (1947)
 The White Primrose (1947)
 Flesh Will Surrender (1947)
 Tragic Hunt (1947)
 Bullet for Stefano (1947)
 Without Pity (1948)
 Crossroads of Passion (1948)
 Escape to France (1948)
 L'eroe della strada (1948)
 How I Discovered America (1949)
 Vertigine d'amore (1949)
 Toto Looks for a House (1949) 
 A Night of Fame (1949)
 Hawk of the Nile (1950)
 No Peace Under the Olive Tree (1950)
 Variety Lights (1950)
 Lorenzaccio (1951)
 Shadows Over Naples (1951)
 Brief Rapture (1951)
 Nobody's Children (1951)
 Tragic Serenade (1951)
 Love and Blood (1951)
 Falsehood (1952)
 Prisoners of Darkness (1952)
 The Wages of Fear (1953)
 The Count of Monte Cristo (1954)
 Maddalena (1954)
 Orient Express (1954)
 Submarine Attack (1954)
 The Air of Paris (1954)
  (1955)
 La risaia (1956)
 We're All Necessary (1956)
  (1956)
 Londra chiama Polo Nord (1956)
  (1957)
  (1958)
 The Sky Burns (1958)
 The Italians They Are Crazy (1958)
 The Great War (1959)
 Wolves of the Deep (1959)
 Sheba and the Gladiator (1959)
 Marie of the Isles (1959)
 Under Ten Flags (1960)
 The Huns (1960) 
 Esther and the King (1960)
 La Fayette (1961)
 The Tartars (1961)
 Oh Islam (1961)
 Romulus and the Sabines (1961)
 Erik the Conqueror (1961)
 Rome 1585 (1961)
 Warriors Five (1962)
  (1963)
 The Organizer (1963)
 Dulcinea (1963)
 Les Parias de la gloire (1964)
 Last Plane to Baalbek (1964)
 Revenge of the Musketeers (1964)
 Marco the Magnificent (1965)
 L'armata Brancaleone (1966)
 Lightning Bolt (1966)
 The Murderer with the Silk Scarf (1966)
 Le Grand Restaurant (1966)
 The Viscount (1967)
 The Longest Hunt (1968)
 Between God, the Devil and a Winchester (1968)
 A Golden Widow'' (1969)

References

External links

1912 births
1970 deaths
Italian male film actors
Actors from Florence
Nastro d'Argento winners
20th-century Italian male actors
Italian resistance movement members